Aleksandr Aleksandrovich Abroskin (born 23 April 1987) is a former Russian football striker.

Club career
He made his Russian Football National League debut for FC Fakel Voronezh on 7 April 2011 in a game against FC Shinnik Yaroslavl.

External links
 
 

1987 births
Sportspeople from Rostov-on-Don
Living people
Russian footballers
Association football forwards
FC Fakel Voronezh players
FC Khimki players
FC Nika Krasny Sulin players
FC SKA Rostov-on-Don players
FC Chayka Peschanokopskoye players